= U Care Fund =

The U Care Fund is an initiative of the Labour Movement that aims to provide financial relief to lower income union members during the current economic downturn. The target was to raise $20 million by May 2009.

At the Solidarity Walk and Concert (organised by Young NTUC) held on 23 May 2009, it was announced that a total of $23.18 million was raised.
